Yours to Command is a 1927 American comedy film directed by David Kirkland and written by Scott Darling and Ewart Adamson. The film stars George O'Hara, Shirley Palmer, William Burress, Dot Farley, Jack Luden and William J. Humphrey. The film was released on May 1, 1927, by Film Booking Offices of America.

Cast           
George O'Hara as Robert Duane
Shirley Palmer as Colleen O'Brien
William Burress as Pa O'Brien
Dot Farley as Ma O'Brien
Jack Luden as Ted Hanson
William J. Humphrey as Parsons

References

External links
 

1927 films
1920s English-language films
Silent American comedy films
1927 comedy films
Film Booking Offices of America films
American silent feature films
American black-and-white films
Films directed by David Kirkland
1920s American films